Gymnothorax aurocephalus is a species of moray eel described on the basis of 4 specimens found in depths of . It was found in the Andaman and Nicobar Islands, India. The body which is deep-brown in color is covered by white spots. It's sharp, jagged teeth are arranged in a single series.

References 

Fish described in 2020